The Battle of Hereford was fought in 760 at Hereford (in what is now Herefordshire, England). The conflict followed decades of hostility between the Welsh Kingdoms of Brycheiniog, Gwent and Powys by Æthelbald of Mercia and Coenred of Wessex, and involved the armies of Mercia and the Welsh. The Welsh were said to have defeated the Mercian army, and freed themselves from the influence of the Anglo-Saxons.

Which Welsh kingdom led the offensive is uncertain. Both King Nowy Hen of Brycheiniog and Eliseg of Powys have been put forward as candidates.

References

External links
 The Battle of Hereford

Hereford 760
Hereford 760
Hereford
760
8th century in England
Military history of Herefordshire
Hereford